Mae Ho Phra is a tambon (sub-district) of Mae Taeng District, in Chiang Mai Province, Thailand. In 2005 it had a population of 5,643 people. The tambon contains nine villages.

References

Tambon of Chiang Mai province
Populated places in Chiang Mai province